The Hypnotic Eye is a 1960 horror film, released by Allied Artists on February 27, 1960, starring Jacques Bergerac, Allison Hayes, Merry Anders, Eric "Big Daddy" Nord, and Ferdinand Demara, billed as "Fred Demara".

Plot
A beautiful young woman comes into her kitchen rubbing shampoo or product into her hair, lights a gas burner on her stove and bends over it as if it were the sink, then rises up screaming with her hair on fire. Later, doctors and police tend her, and Detective Dave Kennedy ask her why she did it. She doesn’t remember. He lies that her looks will be restored, and she thanks God and dies. She is the first fatality of eleven women, all beautiful, who have mutilated their faces in the past few months, and the police are baffled about whether there is a common cause. Dave consults his psychiatrist friend Dr. Philip Hecht, who is an expert on hypnosis and disapproves of its use on the stage.

Dave, his girlfriend Marcia Blaine and her friend Dodie Wilson go to see the stage show of the famous hypnotist Desmond. Dave does not believe in hypnotism and thinks the men who are hypnotized into various abnormal states are stooges. Desmond calls for three women volunteers, and his lovely assistant Justine chooses two of them for him, including Dodie. Desmond hypnotizes her into becoming rigid as a board and levitates her. But before he brings her out of it, he whispers something in her ear. Dave tries to get Dodie to say she was faking; she denies this, won’t go for coffee with them and goes back into the theater when they leave. Later, at home, she pours acid instead of lotion into her washbasin, and applies it to her face.
Dave and Marcia question her in the hospital, and find that she has forgotten how her terrible facial burns happened. Marcia begins to wonder if hypnotic suggestion from Desmond is the common cause of the mutilations. She goes back to the theater alone to investigate, and is chosen by Justine’s significant look at Desmond as a volunteer. When beginning to hypnotize her, he uses an eyeball-shaped device he holds up in the palm of his hand, with concentric circles of flashing light. Marcia closes her eyes before he tells her to and is not hypnotized.

She reports to Dave and Dr. Hecht that she thinks Desmond is guilty; Dr. Hecht agrees that he is a genuine hypnotist with a dangerous, powerful new technique. She tells them of Desmond’s post-hypnotic command to come to his dressing room at midnight. When she does, she opens a box in which the eye-shaped device is flashing, and this time is genuinely hypnotized. Dave and Dr. Hecht follow in Dave's car as Desmond takes her to a fancy restaurant, to a beatnik coffee-house to hear Beat poetry and dance, and back to her apartment. He starts to make out with her, while the two men sit outside, Dave thinking jealously that she is a willing participant and Dr. Hecht wanting more information. Desmond is finally interrupted by the entrance of Justine, who dismisses him and keeps Marcia under hypnosis herself. In his only moment of possible conscience, he asks resentfully “How many more?” and Justine replies “As long as there are faces like this.” She turns on Marcia’s shower with scalding hot water and tells her to step into the cool refreshment. Dave and Dr. Hecht turn up at the door at last and stop this; Justine instructs Marcia to tell them she is an old school roommate and leaves. Dave sees through this story because he knows Marcia never went away to school. He is convinced by Dr. Hecht that Marcia was really hypnotized.

The two men interview past victims of self-mutilation. They all deny ever going to Desmond’s show or hearing of a woman named Justine, but Dave finds a balloon with the hypnotic eye design on it, that is given out at the show, in the purse of a woman who blinded herself. Even Dodie denies ever seeing Desmond’s show or knowing a Justine, but her doctor tells them she was terrified of that name when she was brought in.

Marcia, still under Desmond and Justine’s influence, goes back to the show, where Desmond takes the whole audience through several demonstrations of mass hypnosis or the power of suggestion. The balloons are for the purpose of a suggestion that they are too heavy to lift. Dave and Dr. Hecht break in and try to get to Marcia, but Justine drags her up onto the stage while Desmond tries to stop the men with the hypnotic eye. Dave breaks through its power and the two men get onto the stage. Justine drags Marcia up onto a swinging catwalk and threatens to jump and drag her down. When Dr. Hecht remonstrates with her, she tears off her beautiful mask and shows that she has a badly mutilated face like Dodie’s. Desmond overpowers Dr. Hecht, Dave shoots him from above, and Justine jumps to her death beside him. Dave pulls Marcia up and she comes out of her trance. Dr. Hecht addresses the audience, including the audience in the movie theater, and tells them never to let themselves be hypnotized except under medical supervision.

Cast
 Jacques Bergerac as Desmond
 Allison Hayes as Justine  
 Marcia Henderson as Marcia Blaine  
 Merry Anders as Dodie Wilson  
 Joe Patridge as Det. Sgt. Dave Kennedy  
 Guy Prescott as Dr. Philip Hecht  
 Fred Demara (Ferdinand Demara) as Hospital Doctor
 Jimmy Lydon as Emergency Doctor (as James Lydon)  
 Lawrence Lipton as King of the Beatniks

Production background
Some scenes showing Nord playing bongo drums and Lawrence Lipton as "King of the Beatniks" were supposedly filmed at Nord's beatnik cafe, The Gas House, in Venice, California. But it was done in a studio.

Bergerac was the former husband of Ginger Rogers and Hayes had just starred in Attack of the 50 Foot Woman (1958).

The consultant for the hypnosis used in the film was Gil Boyne. Gil Boyne founded the American Council of Hypnotist Examiners and the Hypnotism Training Institute in Glendale, California. Gil also performed live shows between screenings of the film at the opening at the Golden Gate Theater in San Francisco and went on a press tour to promote the movie appearing on numerous TV news and talk shows performing live hypnosis demonstrations.

The "Hypnomagic" part of the film although somewhat implied was not a filming process like 3D. "Hypnomagic" was advertised on the posters as an "Amazing New Audience Thrill" and although new to film was a much more organic and time tested approach than 3D. "Hypnomagic" featured the Bergerac character performing segments in the film where he looks directly into the camera and as such at the movie theater audience and performs some hypnotic suggestibility tests with them. One suggestibility test presented in the film involved the use of a balloon with an eye printed on it, when the film was in its original run in theaters each theater goer received an eye balloon to use during the demonstration.

Influence on popular culture
There is a scene in the film where a lady while in the trance state thinks her stove is her sink and washes her hair in the stove, receiving horrific burns and disfigurement. In the 1960s the Kodak film company took that scene and using a then cutting edge process made a lenticular photograph out of it. When moving the photo up and down the girls head would catch on fire. The photograph was a little larger than a business card and used as a giveaway to buyers, to spotlight the new photo process that the Kodak company was promoting at the time.

References

External links
 
 
 
 
 
 
 The Gas House at Virtual Venice
 Interview With Film's Screenplay Writer
 The Hypnotic Eye movie trailer

1960 films
American black-and-white films
1960 horror films
Films about hypnosis
Allied Artists films
Films directed by George Blair
1960s English-language films
American horror films
1960s American films